The 2014–15 Missouri Tigers men's basketball team represented the University of Missouri in the 2014–15 NCAA Division I men's basketball season. Their head coach was Kim Anderson, who was in his first year as the head coach at Missouri. The team played its home games at Mizzou Arena in Columbia, Missouri, and played its third season in the Southeastern Conference. They finished the season 9–23, 3–15 in SEC play to finish in last place. They lost in the first round of the SEC tournament to South Carolina.

Preseason
Coming off an inconsistent 2013-14 season that saw Missouri finish with a 23-12 (9-9) record and a trip to the NIT there were many changes that took place in the off/preseason. The team lost the likes of Jabari Brown and Jordan Clarkson to the NBA draft and lost Criswell and Ross to graduation. On April 10, 2014 then head coach Frank Haith kicked Zach Price off the team for legal reasons. The following week on April 18 it was announced that Haith was leaving Missouri and had taken the opening as the head coach of Tulsa. Aften ten days of speculation it was announced that Kim Anderson would be returning to his Alma Mater and become the next head coach at Missouri. The team returned two starters (Ryan Rosburg, Johnathan Williams III), five incoming freshmen (Gant, Wright, Allen, Isabell, Gill-Caesar), and one transfer (Shamburger) making this Missouri Tiger team one of the youngest in the Nation.

Departures

2014 Recruits

2015 Recruits

Roster

Schedule and results

|-
!colspan=12 style="background:#F1B82D; color:#000000;"| Exhibition

|-
!colspan=12 style="background:#F1B82D; color:#000000;"| Non-conference regular season

|-
!colspan=12 style="background:#F1B82D; color:#000000;"| SEC regular season

|-
!colspan=12 style="background:#F1B82D;"| SEC Tournament

References

Missouri Tigers men's basketball seasons
Missouri
Tiger
Tiger